Mohamed Saleem Ali (މުހަންމަދު ސަލީމް އަލީ ) (died 25 December 2007), commonly referred to in the Maldives as Sto, Saleem, was a Parliament member of the Maldivian Democratic Party, elected for president in Huvadhu Atoll with high popularity. Due to his criticism of the dictator Gayoom, over the years he was arrested and sentenced several times.

Saleem, best known for organizing protests against President Gayoom's visits to the MDP heartlands in the south of the country, was a prominent figure within the Maldives' main opposition party. "Mr. Saleem Ali's passing away causes deep sorrow to all who knew him," said a party statement. "A tireless campaigner for reform [Mr Saleem] will be indelible in the party's records as well as the country's history." His son Ghassan Saleem, at the age of 14, was handcuffed and detained for several hours whilst he was walking to his school while Saleem was in jail for investigation for 10 November activity.

References

External links
http://www.dhivehi-observer.com/MDP/Detainees_Lists/MEMBERS_OF_MDP_UNDER_POLICE_DETENTION_AND_SERVING_SENTENCES_31st_July_2006.pdf
https://web.archive.org/web/20090212232312/http://achrweb.org/Review/2006/140-06.htm
https://web.archive.org/web/20110716141824/http://www.dhivehiobserver.com/review/2006/Thinadhoo_Heroes_2611200611828.htm

Year of birth missing
2007 deaths
Maldivian prisoners and detainees
Prisoners and detainees of the Maldives
Members of the People's Majlis
Maldivian Democratic Party politicians